William Jason Vaughan-Davies (born 29 June 1974) is a former Zimbabwean cricketer. Born in Salisbury (now Harare), he played one first-class match for Mashonaland A during the 2000–01 Logan Cup.

References

External links
 
 

1974 births
Living people
Cricketers from Harare
Mashonaland A cricketers
Zimbabwean cricketers